Pat Quinn may refer to:

Pat Quinn (American actress) (born 1937), American actress
Pat Quinn (businessman) (1935–2009), Irish businessman
Pat Quinn (footballer) (1936–2020), Scottish footballer
Pat Quinn (ice hockey) (1943–2014), former NHL player and head coach
Pat Quinn (politician) (born 1948), Governor of Illinois, from 2009 to 2015
Pat Quinn (rugby league), Australian rugby league footballer of the 1940s
Pat Quinn (rugby) (1930–1986), English rugby union and rugby league footballer of the 1950s
Patrick Quinn (ALS activist) (1983–2020), American ALS activist

See also
Patricia Quinn (disambiguation)
Patrick Quinn (disambiguation)
Paddy Quinn (disambiguation)